The Environment and Development Party was a political party in Morocco.

History and profile
The party was founded in April 2002. The founder was Ahmed Alami.

In the parliamentary election held on 27 September 2002, the party won 2 out of 325 seats. In the next parliamentary election, held on 7 September 2007, the party won 2.9% of the votes and 5 out of 325 seats.

It was dissolved and merged into the Authenticity and Modernity Party in 2008.

References

2002 establishments in Morocco
2008 disestablishments in Morocco
Political parties established in 2002
Political parties disestablished in 2008
Defunct political parties in Morocco
Green parties in Africa
Defunct green political parties